Ferdinand Trudel was a politician in Quebec, Canada.

Background

He was born on May 4, 1852 in Sainte-Geneviève-de-Batiscan, Mauricie.

Mayor

Trudel was Mayor of Saint-Stanislas from 1886 to 1888.

Member of the legislature

Trudel ran as a candidate of Honoré Mercier's Parti National in 1886 and won a seat to the provincial legislature, representing the district of Champlain.  In 1890 though, local Bishop Louis-François Richer Laflèche publicly supported the Conservatives.  Trudel and his Nationalist colleagues from the Mauricie area were all defeated.

Federal Politics

He also ran in the federal district of Champlain in 1891, but lost.

Death

He died in office on December 22, 1924.

Footnotes

1852 births
1924 deaths
Mayors of places in Quebec
Quebec Liberal Party MNAs